Frieda Deschacht (born 1968) is a Belgian-Flemish politician and a member of the Flemish Parliament for Vlaams Belang since 2019.

Her husband Christian Verougstraete was a member of the Flemish Parliament for the Vlaams Blok and then the Vlaams Belang. Deschacht also became active in the party and was from 2006 to 2012 elected to the Provincial Council in West Flanders and served as a councilor in Ostend from 2007 to 2012. She was elected to the Flemish Parliament in 2019.

References 

1968 births
Living people
Vlaams Belang politicians
Members of the Flemish Parliament
21st-century Belgian politicians
Belgian city councillors
Belgian women in politics
People from Knokke-Heist